Wallengrenia is a genus of skippers in the family Hesperiidae.

Species
Wallengrenia otho (Smith, 1797)
Wallengrenia egeremet (Scudder, 1863)
Wallengrenia premnas (Wallengren, 1860)

References
Natural History Museum Lepidoptera genus database
Wallengrenia at funet

Hesperiini
Hesperiidae genera